Ochsenberg may refer to:

 Ochsenberg (Königsbronn), a village of Königsbronn in Heidenheim, Baden-Württemberg, Germany
 Ochsenberg (Swabian Jura), a mountain in Baden-Württemberg, Germany

See also
 Ochlenberg, a municipality in Bern, Switzerland